Panhandle Independent School District is a public school district based in Panhandle, Texas (USA).

In 2009, the school district was rated "recognized" by the Texas Education Agency.

Schools
Panhandle High School (Grades 9-12)
Panhandle Junior High (Grades 6-8)
Panhandle Elementary (Grades PK-5)

References

External links
Panhandle ISD

School districts in Carson County, Texas